The Hyundai Rotem CJ151 is the first generation electric multiple unit rolling stock to be introduced on the Jurong Region Line of Singapore's Mass Rapid Transit (MRT) system, manufactured by Hyundai Rotem under Contract J151. 62 three-car medium-capacity Hyundai Rotem trainsets (186 cars) will be delivered from 2024 onwards and service will commence when the line opens in 2027.

Tender 
The tender for trains under the contract J151 was closed on 13 June 2019 with four bids. The LTA has shortlisted all of them and the results has been released.

Note: Awarded amount to Hyundai Rotem Company as announced by LTA is at SGD 416,499,000.00

Design & features
The train's exterior will feature a livery that is mainly teal in color to reflect the line's color on the MRT map. The design features a sleek modern look, with angular LED headlights, similar to that of the C951(A) and R151 trains. It will feature wider doors at 1.5 metres each, to allow for quicker alighting and boarding, compared to the 1.45 metres on current trains. Every car will include an open area to accommodate wheelchair users and strollers, compared to the single wheelchair allocation in specific cars on current trains.

The trains also include several features to facilitate more efficient maintenance of the rolling stock and tracks, such as advanced condition monitoring sensors and diagnostic systems to detect faults beforehand. In addition, some trains will also have an Automatic Track Inspection (ATI) system, consisting of cameras, lasers and sensors, to detect rail defects in real-time. A first for an MRT rolling stock, the trains have onboard emergency batteries capable of driving the train to the closest station for passenger evacuation in the event of a power outage. While current rolling stock also have emergency batteries, they are only capable of provided emergency ventilation and lighting for evacuation onto the tracks.

The manufacturer will also tap on existing suppliers of components and systems that are currently used on other rolling stock on the network, which allows for greater commonality between the rolling stock that streamlines maintenance.

References

Mass Rapid Transit (Singapore) rolling stock
750 V DC multiple units
Hyundai Rotem multiple units
Automated guideway transit